Tosxampila is a genus of moths within the family Castniidae.

Species
Tosxampila annae (Biedermann, 1935)
Tosxampila mimica (Felder, 1874)

References

Castniidae